Oben is both a given name and a surname. It may refer to:

Surname
Crispín Oben (1876–1947), Filipino lawyer and politician
Ernest Oben-Etchi (born 1975), Cameroonian footballer
Roman Oben (born 1972), Cameroonian-born American football player, broadcaster, and NFL executive

Given name
Oben Gunderson Jr. (born 1927), American politician and farmer
Samuel Oben Ojong (born 1980), Cameroonian footballer

See also
Oban (disambiguation)